Murge may refer to:

Geography
Altopiano delle Murge – plateau in Apulia, Italy
Alta Murgia National Park
Minervino Murge – town
Cassano delle Murge – town

Other
154th Infantry Division Murge
Roman Catholic Diocese of Minervino Murge
Murgese – horse breed